Douglas J. Hudson (born c. 1943) is a Canadian curler.

At the national level, he won the 1976 Macdonald Brier, as a member of the first-ever team from Newfoundland and Labrador to win the Brier.

Personal life
As of 1992, Hudson was employed as an accountant for a St. John's ferry company.

Teams

References

External links
 
 Douglas Hudson – Curling Canada Stats Archive
 
 1976 Brier - CurlingRichardsons
 

Living people
Canadian male curlers
Brier champions
1940s births
Place of birth missing (living people)
Curlers from Newfoundland and Labrador